Komar University of Science and Technology (KUST)  is a private university located in the city of Sulaimany in Kurdistan region. It was founded in 2009.

History 
Komar University of Science and Technology (KUST) - Sulaimani was established and licensed by the Ministry of Higher Education and Scientific Research of the Kurdistan Regional Government, by the official letter no. 17867/7 on October 18, 2009. KUST is a private university governed by a Board of Trustees and run by an Administration Council. Its main campus is located in the city of Sulaimani, in Kurdistan- Iraq.
KUST offered its first teaching classes in 2010 with an English language summer course (levels 1 and 3).

Colleges
KUST has five colleges, the College of  Business, the college of Medicine, the college of Dentistry, the College of  Engineering, and the College of Sciences.

The College of Business has four departments:
Department of Accounting
Department of e-Commerce
Department of Information Management 
Department of Business Administrative
Computer Science

The college of medicine has 2 departments:
Department of Pharmacy
Department of Medical Laboratory Science
It also has a pharmacy

The college of Dentistry has the department of Dentistry and a Dental clinic

The College of  Engineering has four departments:
Department of Computer Engineering
Department of Civil Engineering
Department of Environmental Engineering
Department of Petroleum Engineering

References 

Sulaymaniyah
Private universities and colleges
Universities in Kurdistan Region (Iraq)
Educational institutions established in 2009
2009 establishments in Iraqi Kurdistan